KF Vjosa is a professional football club from Kosovo which competes in the Second League. The club is based in Shtime. Their home ground is the Shtime Sports Complex which has a viewing capacity of 1,000.

See also
 List of football clubs in Kosovo

References

Football clubs in Kosovo
Association football clubs established in 1985
1985 establishments in Yugoslavia